, better known with his stage name "SWAY" is a Japanese rapper, actor, lyricist and producer managed by LDH and signed to Def Jam Recordings. He is a member of the group Doberman Infinity, of EXILE's theater company (Gekidan EXILE) and is also a soloist.

Early life 
Shuhei Nogae was born on June 9, 1986, in Sapporo, Hokkaido Prefecture, Japan. Growing up, Shuhei was a huge fan of basketball, especially the NBA. He would regularly buy the sports magazine Hoop and at one point, he read an article about Allen Iverson and Kobe Bryant doing some rapping. Since they were his idols during his junior high school years, he became interested in rap music and hip-hop culture. For this reason he started singing and DJing as a hobby. In the 3rd grade of junior high school, he started learning graphic design and break dance besides his other activities. He also produced a dance track, wrote lyrics and started to rap.

At the age of 16, his mindset changed and he became serious about a career as a rapper after watching the movie 8 Mile. The impact of the movie led him to choose a stage name by searching through an English-Japanese dictionary. The word 'sway' stuck with him since its sound was close to his birth name and he also liked the meaning. However, he faced a huge problem starting as a rapper: He didn't know what he should write about in his lyrics and felt like his experiences didn't matter since his life had been so different from the American rappers he listened to. He overcame this obstacle by realizing there were also famous rappers who talked about fairly normal things in their lyrics, such as Kanye West for example.

Sway formed a group called Wild Style with his close friend Shokichi when he was 17 and they performed together during their late teens until Sway moved to Toronto, Canada where he lived and studied for two years from 19 to 21 years old while doing various part-time jobs including waiting tables at a Japanese restaurant.

After returning to Hokkaido, he worked at a clothing store while rapping in the evenings. Despite enjoying both jobs, he envisioned his future differently. In his mid-twenties, he decided to move to Tokyo and perform there at clubs. During that time, Shokichi, who was now a member of famous J-Pop boygroup Exile, called him and stated he wanted to make music together again. Therefore they wrote three songs and Shokichi presented them to Exile leader Hiroyuki Igarashi who approved of their work.

Career 
Subsequently, Sway signed with LDH, the company founded by Exile.

In August 2012, he debuted as an actor in the stage play Attack No. 1 and in September, he joined Gekidan Exile (Exile's theater company). Since then he started to work both in music and acting.

In June 2014, he joined the group Doberman Infinity. Two years later in April 2016, he also joined the hip-hop group Honest Boyz.

On September 16, 2017, he announced his major solo debut with single "Manzana", which was released on November 1 under Universal Music Japan's sub-label Def Jam Recordings. On November 11, Sway formed the creative unit "N0IR (Noir)".

On August 29, 2018, he released his debut album titled Unchained. On December 12, 2018, he announced that he would use "Sway" also during acting activities that used his real name.

Participating groups

Discography

Studio albums

Singles

Digital singles

Participating works

Lyrics

Live

Filmography

Movies

TV Dramas

Stage

CM

Commercials

Voice Acting

Music Videos

References

External links 
 SWAY – UNIVERSAL MUSIC JAPAN
 
 劇団EXILE

1986 births
Living people
21st-century Japanese male actors
Japanese male film actors
Japanese male television actors
LDH (company) artists
Japanese rappers
Japanese hip hop musicians
21st-century Japanese male singers
21st-century Japanese singers